Actia dasymyia is a species of tachinid flies in the genus Actia of the family Tachinidae.

References

Diptera of North America
dasymyia
Insects described in 1991